No Open Flames is the first EP of South Korean rapper Simon Dominic. It was released on September 3, 2019 through AOMG.

Singles 
"DAx4" was released on August 14, 2019.

"Make Her Dance" was released on August 21, 2019 and peaked at number 86 on the Gaon Digital Chart.

Critical reception 
Lee Jin-seok of Rhythmer rated No Open Flames 3.5 out of 5 stars. According to Lee, it is the most enjoyable and complete work in Simon Dominic's discography.

Accolades

Track listing

References 
2019 EPs
Korean-language EPs
Hip hop EPs

AOMG EPs